Terowie may refer to:

Terowie, South Australia, a town and locality
Terowie railway line, a closed railway line in South Australia
Terowie railway station, a closed railway  station
District Council of Terowie, a former local government area in South Australia
Hundred of Terowie, a cadastral unit in South Australia

See also